Bridge End railway station served Bridgend in  County Donegal in the Republic of Ireland.

The Londonderry and Lough Swilly Railway opened the station on 12 November 1881.

It closed on 6 September 1948

Routes

References

Disused railway stations in County Donegal
Railway stations opened in 1881
Railway stations closed in 1948
1881 establishments in Ireland
1948 disestablishments in Ireland
Railway stations in Northern Ireland opened in the 19th century